The second Stanhope–Sunderland ministry (1718–1721) was a continuation of the British Whig government headed by The Earl of Sunderland and The Earl Stanhope. These had taken power in 1717 to form the First Stanhope–Sunderland ministry, and in 1718 they interchanged positions, with Sunderland becoming First Lord of the Treasury. The ministry terminated upon Stanhope's death in February 1721.

Ministry

References

References

British ministries
Government
1718 establishments in Great Britain
1721 disestablishments in Great Britain
1710s in Great Britain
1720s in Great Britain
Ministries of George I of Great Britain